The 2010 Wakefield Metropolitan District Council election took place on 6 May 2010 to elect members of Wakefield Metropolitan District Council in West Yorkshire, England. One third of the council was up for election and the Labour party stayed in overall control of the council with an increased majority.

After the election, the composition of the council was as follows.

Labour 33 (+1)
Conservative 24 (+1)
Independent 5 (-1)
Liberal Democrat 1 (-1)

Election result

Ward results

Ackworth, North Elmsall and Upton ward

Airedale and Ferry Fryston ward

Altofts and Whitwood ward

Castleford Central and Glasshoughton ward

Crofton, Ryhill and Walton ward

Featherstone ward

Hemsworth ward

Horbury and South Ossett ward

Knottingley ward

Normanton ward

Ossett ward

Pontefract North ward

Pontefract South ward

South Elmsall and South Kirkby ward

Stanley and Outwood East ward

Wakefield East ward

Wakefield North ward

Wakefield Rural ward

Wakefield South ward

Wakefield West ward

Wrenthorpe and Outwood West ward

References

2010 English local elections
May 2010 events in the United Kingdom
2010
2010s in West Yorkshire